Varpay-e Olya (also Romanized as Varpāy-e ‘Olyā; also known as Varapā-ye Bālā, Varpā, Varpa Olya, Varpā-ye ‘Olyā, and Warpa) is a village in Kuhestan Rural District, in the Central District of Nain County, Isfahan Province, Iran. At the 2006 census, its population was 127, in 47 families.

References 

Populated places in Nain County